Ivan Nikulin: Russian Sailor, is a 1944 Soviet drama film directed by Igor Savchenko.

Plot 
The film takes place in the summer of 1942. The film tells about the sailors of the Black Sea fleet Ivan Nikulin and Vasily Klevtsov, returning to their carriages. On the way, they meet other sailors who join them and help to rebuff the Germans who stand in their way.

Starring 
 Ivan Pereverzev as Ivan Nikulin
 Boris Chirkov as Zakhar Fomichyov (as B. Chirkov)
 Stepan Kayukov as Papasha (as S. Kayukov)
 Erast Garin as Tikhon Spiridonovich (as E. Garin)
 Zoya Fyodorova as Marusya Kryukova
 Nikolay Sidorkin as Nikolay Zhukov (as N. Sidorkin)
 Sergey Nikonov as Vasiliy Klevtsov (as S. Nikonov)
 Vsevolod Sanaev as Alyokha (as V. Sanaev)
 Mikhail Rumyantsev as Italian Soldier (as M. Rumyantsev)
 Viktor Bubnov as Commandant (uncredited)

References

External links 
 

1944 films
1940s Russian-language films
Soviet drama films
1944 drama films